Pedro Llorente (born 19 October 1897, in Elche, Spain) was a Spanish soccer manager. He coached Real Madrid during 1926–27 period.

Extra Link
 Pedro Llorente on Real Madrid Official site.

Spanish football managers
Real Madrid CF managers
1897 births
Year of death missing